Staroselye is a rural locality (a village) in Vyborgsky District of Leningrad Oblast, Russia, located on the Karelian Isthmus at the head of Zagorsky Gulf, Lake Glubokoye.

History
Before 1939, it was a part of Viipuri Province, Finland and was known as Keskikylä. It also consisted of four lesser settlements: Jääskelä, Norkkola, Orola, and Pyykkölä. In 1948, Jääskelä was renamed Voskhod after a kolkhoz of the same name had been established in the village. Soon after it was renamed again, this time Staroselye. The new name was soon spread on the whole Keskikylä. On January 13, 1949, it was confirmed by the Presidium of Supreme Soviet of Russia.

External links
Keskikylä on Muolaa map
Kannas.nm.ru. Article about Staroselye 

Rural localities in Leningrad Oblast
Karelian Isthmus